Shahi jilapi is a famous and traditional sweetmeat originating from  Chowk Bazaar in Old Dhaka of Bangladesh, which is very popular throughout the country. Especially, in Ramadan it is most commonly prepared and sold in Chawkbazar of Old Dhaka which is a popular iftar hub to the natives of Dhaka.

This traditional jilapi is made by twisting the dough like a coil. Radius of the each jilapi can be a few inches and weight varies from 1 to 2 kg or even 2.5 kilograms. It is so huge that it is eaten in iftar or snacks by a group of 3 or 4 persons. Shahi jilapi, known for its large size but the great taste of its makes it unique and its name substantial.

History
Although jilapi was created in the early fifteenth century, Shahi jilapi is a bit more modern addition. It was introduced to the Dhakaiya people  a few decades ago. Families living in old Dhaka, used to buy it and ate it together. Gradually, it also became popular at iftar and  wedding or occasional banquets, and many others started to make it. The word Shahi, means something which is royal. Shahi jilapi came from the shahi kitchen(literally royal kitchen) of the Nawabs of Dhaka. They would eat it during family occasions and that's where the idea came from. Thus, therefore, the name of this large, delicious and famous sweetmeat is Shahi Jilapi.

Ingredients
 Mashkolai dal
 Baking powder
 Sugar syrup
 Pea-flour
 Ghee
 Dalda
 Flour
 Oil
 Rose water
 Cinnamon
 Cardamom
etc.

Preparations
At first ingredients like flour, baking powder, powdered milk and salt are mixed together.  A paste is made by mixing hot milk and flour together . After rubbing the paste by hands like the dough of a ruti, it is then divided into several pieces and each of the piece is given a long shape. Then the pieces are turned into coil shape by twisting and get deep fried into oil. Syrup is made from sugar, water, cinnamon and  cardamom in another pot while making sure that the syrup is not too thick or heavy. After that, the fried jilapies are then poured into the syrup as early as possible and get heated again for 4–5 minutes. As a result, the jilapies swells a little bigger. Then, for a couple of hours, the jilapies are kept inside the syrup so that all of the juice enters into the jilapi which makes them almost two times bigger. The process then ends.

References

Bangladeshi desserts